Baron Géza Fejérváry de Komlóskeresztes (15 March 1833 – 25 April 1914) was a Hungarian general who served as the prime minister in a government of bureaucrats appointed by King Franz Joseph during the Hungarian Constitutional Crisis of 1903–1907.

Biography
He began his career in the army. As a captain in 1859, he was part of the Austrian forces opposing the Second Italian War of Independence and participated in an action on hotly contested heights of San Martino in front of Solferino. For his heroism in this, he won the cross of Maria Theresa – Austria-Hungary's highest military decoration. In 1864 fought against the Danes in the Second Schleswig War.

In 1872 Fejérváry became State Secretary in the Hungarian Ministry of National Defence (Honvéd) and Minister of National Defence in 1884. In 1895 he persuaded Franz Joseph to agree to the religious and political reforms of the Sándor Wekerle ministry. In 1903 he resigned, together with the prime minister, Kálmán Széll, owing to the rejection of a bill to increase the contingent of recruits, and was appointed captain of the Hungarian Life-Guards organized at that time.

Fejérváry was appointed premier 18 June 1905. The parliamentary majority declared that the Fejérváry ministry was unconstitutional, and organized a national opposition against it. Fejérváry nevertheless succeeded in settling these differences by the so-called Pactum, on the basis of which the Wekerle ministry was formed 8 April 1906. From this time onwards Fejervary's political activity ceased and he resumed his military career. On the death of Prince Esterházy, Captain of the Hungarian Royal Guard, Fejerváry was appointed his successor.

He died of cancer of the tongue.

Notes

References

1833 births
1914 deaths
People from Jaroměř
People from the Kingdom of Bohemia
Prime Ministers of Hungary
Defence ministers of Hungary
Foreign ministers of Hungary
Finance ministers of Hungary
Agriculture ministers of Hungary
Hungarian nobility
Hungarian expatriates in the Czech lands
Burials at the Vienna Central Cemetery
Knights Cross of the Military Order of Maria Theresa
Grand Crosses of the Order of Saint Stephen of Hungary
Grand Crosses of the Order of the Crown (Romania)
Recipients of the Order of the Cross of Takovo
Officiers of the Légion d'honneur
Theresian Military Academy alumni
Austrian military personnel of the Second Schleswig War